Michalovce (Romani: Mihalya, Yiddish: Mikhaylovets or Mykhaylovyts) is a town on the Laborec river in eastern Slovakia. Originally named after the Archangel St Michael,  it is the second-largest city in the Košice Region and the seat of the Michalovce District.

Michalovce is mostly recognized for its adjacent lakes and volcanic mountains, which generates tourism, and for agriculture as well as the passing Druzhba pipeline. According to the latest census, the population of the town stood at 40,255, with a metropolitan population of 109,121, which ranks it among the largest population centers in eastern Slovakia.

History

Early history 
The city of present-day Michalovce along with the adjacent lowlands was settled in from the Palaeolithic era. Archaeologists have found prehistoric Homo sapiens skeletons in the region, as well as numerous objects and vestiges by the foot of the Vihorlat mountains, dating from the Neolithic.  During the Late Bronze Age, which meant the period of processing bronze as the main metal, the surrounding area was an important cultural and trading center within the Carpathian Basin and, together with the area of the southern Tisa River Basin, played an important part forging relations with areas outside of the Carpathians. The history of Michalovce was significantly influenced by presence of Celtic tribes, starting from the Gallic expansions in the 4th century BC, and later by the Romans.

Slovak historians claim that Slavs arrived in the area in the fifth century, first being a part of the empire of the Avars. Although there is no evidence, Slovak historians claim that the area was part of the Great Moravian empire in the ninth century. It is probably unlikely. The town of Michalovce is the place where the legendary Prince Laborec died and was buried according to legends. From the tenth century onwards, the region was part of Hungary. However, when the Magyar tribes arrived in the late 800s, the entire region was sparsely populated and there were few actual settlements. Much of Slovak history is based on conjecture, legends and nationalism.

After the Ottoman conquest in south central Hungary in the sixteenth century, Hungary was divided, and present-day Michalovce became part of the Eastern Hungarian Kingdom, and later Royal Hungary. The town grew significantly in the eighteenth and nineteenth centuries. Since the Austrian-Hungarian Ausgleich of 1867, it achieved the status of a large community, and shortly afterward became the seat of one of the districts of Zemplén County.

Modern history 

The 19th century brought back significant development of the town. In 1828, there were 49 craftsman workshops representing all 22 kinds of craft production of the crafts licences in the region of Zemplin. Until 1874 there were a few industrial factories of local importance in the surroundings of Michalovce (starch factories, distilleries, mill-houses, brickworks) with a limited number of work opportunities. The construction of the railway linking Michalovce with Medzilaborce in 1874, as well as the construction of the first railway linking Hungary with Galicia in 1871, had a profound impact on the production, business, and regional development in and around Michalovce.

More food-processing factories and industrial factories – a brewery, two brickworks and a steam millhouse – were established. Starting in 1876 doctors were employed in the town, as the Štefan Kukura Hospital was established that year. In 1896 the Hungarian language newspaper Felso Zemplén was published. In 1805 a common school is founded, which later changed into a state school. In 1804, a post office was established, and in 1873 a printing office was established.

In 1885, by a decision of the municipal council, a fire brigade was founded, and the first public lighting was provided. Unemployment, being a widespread side-effect of the 18th century, resulted in the emigration of mainly farmers. Many left to seek work in the coal mining industry in Pennsylvania, United States, giving rise to a large Rusyn American community there.

After World War I, in 1918 (confirmed by the Treaty of Trianon in 1920), Michalovce, along with some other parts of Zemplén County, became part of the then-formed Czechoslovakia. In late summer and early autumn (August/September) 1944, 3500 Jewish inhabitants were deported from Michalovce. Since 1993, with the breakup of Czechoslovakia, Michalovce has been part of Slovakia. In 1996 it was made the seat of the Michalovce District.

The previous agricultural character of Michalovce was changed by a number of newly established industrial factories after 1945. In the 1950s and 1960s, factories processing agricultural products, and textile, engineering and construction companies arose. These included Agricultural Business and Supply Company, East-Slovak Dairy, East-Slovak Bakery and Confectionery, Slovak Malt Plant, East-Slovak Poultry Plant, Clothing Company and Odeta, a production company. During the early 1960s, construction of the Druzhba pipeline was a major source of employment.

Geography
The town lies in the Košice Region, in the Eastern Slovak Lowland on the Laborec river, historically belonging to Zemplén County. Geographical features nearby include the Vihorlat Mountains and the Zemplínska šírava lake. Nearby is the biggest lake of the Vihorlat Mountains, Morské oko, Vinné castle and Vinné lake.

Demographics
In 1910, Michalovce had 6120 residents, of whom 3792 were Hungarian, 1586 Slovak and 542 German. The religious makeup was 38.6% Roman Catholic, 32.3% Jewish and 23.2% Greek Catholic. After World War II, due to the Presidential Benes decrees, almost the entire population of the region's ethnic Hungarians and Germans (including the region's native Carpathian Germans) were forcibly expelled. Those remaining were assimilated and subjected to Slovakization.

According to the 2001 census, the town had 39,948 inhabitants. 94.57% were Slovaks, 2.24% were Roma, 0.73% were Czechs and 0.47% were Ukrainian. The religious makeup was 53.92% Roman Catholics, 19.65% Greek Catholics, 9.73% people with no religious affiliation and 5.19% Orthodox.

According to the 2011 census, the town had 40,027 inhabitants. 79.53% of the inhabitants were Slovaks, 3.09% were Roma, 0.39% were Czechs and 0.36% were Ukrainians. 15.47% did not specify a nationality. The religious makeup was 42.07% Roman Catholics, 16.50% Greek Catholics, 3.96% Orthodox, 3.97% Evangelicals, 10.33% with no religious affiliation and 18.30% who did not specify affiliation.

Education
The city of Michalovce is home to many secondary schools and some university colleges. Of the seven secondary schools, the most well-known and prestigious is the Pavol Horov Gymnasium. The other gymnasium is Gymnazium na ulici Ľudovita Štúra 26.

Health care
The largest health care provider in the municipality is the Štefan Kukura Hospital in Michalovce, with 712 beds.

Sport
The town has two professional top division clubs: football club MFK Zemplín Michalovce and ice hockey club HK Dukla Michalovce.

Twin towns — sister cities

Michalovce is twinned with:

 Cognac, France 
 Jarosław, Poland
 Kavarna, Bulgaria
 Liptovský Mikuláš, Slovakia
 Pančevo, Serbia
 Sátoraljaújhely, Hungary
 Uzhhorod, Ukraine
 Villarreal, Spain
 Vyškov, Czech Republic

Notable people

 Presian, (ca.996-ca.1060) son of the Bulgarian tsar Ivan Vladislav (the gravestone of a certain "Prince Presian" was found in Michalovce)
 Aurél Dessewffy (1808 at Nagy-Mihály – 1842), Hungarian journalist and politician.
 Volodymyr Sichynskyi (1894 in Kamianets-Podilskyi – 1962) a Ukrainian émigré architect, graphic artist, and art historian.
 Emília Sičáková-Beblavá (born 1975 in Snina, Slovakia) a professor of Public Policy at the Comenius University in Bratislava.

References
Notes

External links

 Michalovce - Official city website
 Michalovce - detailed map guide
  Michalovce - ShtetLink
  Michalovce - photographs and information (in Polish)

Villages and municipalities in Michalovce District
Cities and towns in Slovakia
Mikhaylovets
Romani communities in Slovakia
Czech communities
Holocaust locations in Czechoslovakia